Another Chance may refer to:

 "Another Chance" (Roger Sanchez song), 2001
 "Another Chance" (Tammy Wynette song), 1982
 Another Chance (film), a 1989 film